Pregradnaya is a rural locality (a stanitsa) and the administrative center of Urupsky District of the Karachay-Cherkess Republic, Russia. Population:

References

Notes

Sources

Rural localities in Karachay-Cherkessia